"City of Mary", also known as "Misto Marii", is a 2022 single by Ukrainian band Okean Elzy. The song was released on 22 April 2022 as a music video, and released on 10 May 2022 on streaming platforms.

Background 
According to band frontman Sviatoslav Vakarchuk, a military friend of Vakarchuk, who was fighting in the Siege of Mariupol, requested that the band should make a song that paid tribute to the Ukrainian fighters defending the city. Vakarchuk accepted, saying "it tears me from the inside every day when I read the news about Mariupol."

Composition 
The song is dedicated to the Ukrainian fighters of the Siege of Mariupol. The band sings about how Mariupol will stand against Russian attacks, no matter how fierce they are. The song also features excerpts from Ukrainian patriotic song "Oi u luzi chervona kalyna".

References 

2022 songs
2022 singles
Songs about the 2022 Russian invasion of Ukraine
Mariupol